Alvin Edward O'Konski (May 26, 1904July 8, 1987) was an American politician and educator who served 30 years in the United States House of Representatives. A Republican, he represented northwestern Wisconsin from 1943 until 1973.

Early life and education 

O'Konski was born on a farm near Kewaunee, Wisconsin to Antonia ( Paskaand) and Frank O'Konski, on May 26, 1904. He attended the local public schools and the University of Iowa. He graduated from State Teachers College (now University of Wisconsin–Oshkosh) in Oshkosh, Wisconsin in 1927, and from the University of Wisconsin (now University of Wisconsin–Madison) in 1932.

Career 
He was a high school teacher in Omro and Oconto from 1926 to 1929, a member of the faculty of Oregon State College at Corvallis, Oregon, from 1929 to 1931, and a faculty member at the University of Detroit from 1936 to 1938. He was superintendent of schools in Pulaski, Wisconsin, from 1932 to 1935 and an instructor at a junior college in Coleraine, Minnesota, in 1936. He was an educator, journalist, lecturer, editor and publisher at Hurley, Wisconsin, from 1940 to 1942.

In 1942, O'Konski was elected as a Republican to the 78th United States Congress. He was then reelected to the fourteen succeeding Congresses serving from January 3, 1943, till January 3, 1973. While in congress, he represented Wisconsin's 10th congressional district. In 1957, he was an unsuccessful candidate in the Republican primary in the special election to replace United States Senator Joseph McCarthy, who had died in office. O'Konski voted in favor of the Civil Rights Acts of 1957, 1960, 1964, and 1968, as well as the 24th Amendment to the U.S. Constitution and the Voting Rights Act of 1965.

O'Konski represented a district that included much of the northwestern part of the state, including Rhinelander and Superior. However, after the 1970 census, Wisconsin lost a district, and most of O'Konski's territory was merged with Wisconsin's 7th congressional district represented by three-term Democratic Party member Dave Obey. O'Konski retained only about 40 percent of his former territory, a disadvantage he was unable to overcome despite his seniority. Even though Richard Nixon carried most of the district in the 1972 election, O'Konski was defeated. A proposed navy project called Project Sanguine which O'Konski supported may have been a factor in his loss.

While still serving in Congress, O'Konski founded WAEO-TV, the NBC affiliate for most of north-central Wisconsin. He sold the station in 1976; it is now WJFW-TV.

Personal life 
O'Konski lived in Kewaunee, Wisconsin, until his death in 1987. He is buried at St. Hedwig's Cemetery, a rural church cemetery west of Kewaunee.

References

External links

 Rep. Alvin O’Konski at GovTrack
 

1904 births
1987 deaths
School superintendents in Wisconsin
20th-century American educators
Catholics from Wisconsin
University of Iowa alumni
Oregon State University faculty
University of Wisconsin–Oshkosh alumni
University of Detroit Mercy faculty
People from Kewaunee, Wisconsin
People from Winter Park, Florida
University of Wisconsin–Madison alumni
American politicians of Polish descent
Republican Party members of the United States House of Representatives from Wisconsin
People from Rhinelander, Wisconsin
20th-century American politicians